The 2014 McNeese State Cowboys football team represented McNeese State University in the 2014 NCAA Division I FCS football season. The Cowboys were led by ninth-year head coach Matt Viator and played their home games at Cowboy Stadium. They are a member of the Southland Conference.  The Cowboys finished the season 6–5 overall and 4–4 in conference play to finish in a three way tie for sixth place.

Schedule

Ranking movements

References

McNeese State
McNeese Cowboys football seasons
McNeese State Cowboys football